Jeemon Panniyammakal is a faculty member in the Achutha Menon Centre for Health Science Studies (AMCHSS) in
Sree Chitra Tirunal Institute for Medical Sciences and Technology, Thiruvananthapuram, Kerala, India. Jeemon Panniyammakal has made significant contributions to public health in general and in particular to prevention and control of cardiovascular diseases and diabetes in India. He was awarded the Shanti Swarup Bhatnagar Prize for Science and Technology in Medical Sciences in the year 2021 for his contributions to public health. In his research, he has been supported with grants from several global organisations including Wellcome Trust, Medical Research Council (United Kingdom) (UK), National Health and Medical Research Council (Australia), National Institutes of Health (USA) and International Diabetes Federation. 

Jeemon Panniyammakal, who hails from Nilambur, Kerala, India,  obtained PhD degree from the University of Glasgow, UK and MPH degree from the Sree Chitra Tirunal Institute of Medical Sciences and Technology.

Honours and recognitions
The honours and recognitions conferred on Jeemon Panniyammakal include:
Emerging Leader - World Heart Federation (2019)
Editorial Fellow, Annals of Family Medicine, University of Michigan, USA 
Fellow of the Royal Society for Public Health (London)
Fellow of the European Society of Cardiology (FESC)
Senior Clinical and Public Health Fellow DBT-Wellcome Trust India Alliance (IA)

References

External links

Recipients of the Shanti Swarup Bhatnagar Award in Medical Science
Indian medical writers
Indian medical academics
Indian medical researchers
Living people
Year of birth missing (living people)